Maryland's Legislative District 16 is one of 47 districts in the state for the Maryland General Assembly. It covers part of Montgomery County.

Demographic characteristics
As of the 2020 United States census, the district had a population of 134,804, of whom 105,717 (78.4%) were of voting age. The racial makeup of the district was 91,639 (68.0%) White, 7,317 (5.4%) African American, 222 (0.2%) Native American, 18,328 (13.6%) Asian, 36 (0.0%) Pacific Islander, 3,006 (2.2%) from some other race, and 14,221 (10.5%) from two or more races. Hispanic or Latino of any race were 12,222 (9.1%) of the population.

The district had 93,897 registered voters as of October 17, 2020, of whom 20,283 (21.6%) were registered as unaffiliated, 14,754 (15.7%) were registered as Republicans, 57,710 (61.5%) were registered as Democrats, and 779 (0.8%) were registered to other parties.

Political representation
The district currently is represented in the State Senate by Ariana B. Kelly (D). The district is represented for the 2023–2027 legislative term in the House of Delegates by Marc A. Korman (D) and Sara N. Love (D).  There is a vacancy for the third seat.

References

Montgomery County, Maryland
16
16